Piotr Jabłoński (born 15 January 1975) is a Polish wrestler. He competed in the men's Greco-Roman 48 kg at the 1996 Summer Olympics.

References

External links
 

1975 births
Living people
Polish male sport wrestlers
Olympic wrestlers of Poland
Wrestlers at the 1996 Summer Olympics
People from Chełm
Sportspeople from Lublin Voivodeship